, often known simply as Kazu (nicknamed "King Kazu"), is a Japanese  professional footballer who plays as a forward for Liga Portugal 2 club Oliveirense, on loan from J1 League club Yokohama FC. He is regarded as the oldest professional footballer in history and the oldest player to score in a professional match.

He played for the Japan national team from 1990 to 2000, and was the first Japanese recipient of the IFFHS Asia's Footballer of the Year award. Miura, whose rise to fame in Japan coincided with the launch of the J.League in 1993, was arguably Japan's first superstar in football. He is also known for his trademark "Kazu Feint" and his famous "Kazu dance", when he scores great goals or produces great plays.

Miura holds the records for being the oldest goalscorer in the J-League, the footballer with the world's longest professional career, and, as of 2023, is the oldest professional footballer in the world at 56. He also holds the unique distinction of having played professional football in five separate decades (1980s–2020s). His elder brother Yasutoshi is  also a former professional footballer.

Club career

Early career 
In 1982, Miura left the Shizuoka Gakuen High School after less than a year, and travelled alone to Brazil at the age of fifteen to become a professional footballer there. He signed with the youth squad of São Paulo side Juventus, and in 1986, Miura signed his first professional contract with Santos. He played for several other Brazilian clubs, including Palmeiras and Coritiba, until his return to Japan in 1990.

Verdy Kawasaki 
His time in Brazil elevated him to star status and on his return to Japan, he joined the Japan Soccer League (JSL) side Yomiuri SC, which later spun off from its parent company Yomiuri Shinbun and became Verdy Kawasaki with the launch of the J1 League in 1993. With Yomiuri/Kawasaki, Miura won four consecutive league titles playing alongside fellow Japanese national team regulars Ruy Ramos and Tsuyoshi Kitazawa. Yomiuri won the last two JSL titles in 1991 and 1992, and Verdy Kawasaki won the first two J1 League titles in 1993 and 1994. He was named the first J.League Most Valuable Player in 1993.

Loan to Genoa 
Miura then became the first Japanese footballer to play in Italy, joining Genoa in the 1994–95 Serie A season. In his Italian stint, he played 21 times and scored one goal, during the Genoa derby against Sampdoria. On 15 January 1994, Miura assisted Antonio Manicone's match-winning goal against Padova.

Return to Verdy Kawasaki 
He returned to Verdy Kawasaki for the 1995 season and played with them until the end of the 1998 season.

Dinamo Zagreb 
Miura made another attempt at playing in Europe with Croatia Zagreb in 1999.

Return to Japan 
He returned to Japan, however, following a brief trial with AFC Bournemouth, in the same year, and played with Kyoto Purple Sanga and Vissel Kobe.

Yokohama FC 
In 2005, Miura signed for Yokohama FC in 2005. In 2007, Miura was selected for the 2007 J.League All-Star Soccer for J-East and played exceptionally well. 

In November 2015, Miura signed a new one-year contract with Yokohama FC at the age of 48. In January 2017, Miura signed another new one-year contract with Yokohama, taking his professional career into his fifties.

On 5 March 2017, Miura became the oldest ever player to feature in a professional match when he started in Yokohama's 1–1 draw against V-Varen Nagasaki. With 50 years and seven days, he surpassed the previous record held by Stanley Matthews from 1965 by two days. Seven days later, he broke Matthews' record for oldest goalscorer in professional football when he struck the only goal of a 1–0 win over Thespakusatsu Gunma.

In January 2018, he signed a new contract, and renewed it again in January 2019, January 2020, and January 2021.

On 5 August 2020, he started in a J.League Cup match against Sagan Tosu, becoming the oldest player to take to the pitch in Japan's league cup competition, at the age of 53 years, 5 months and 10 days.  By doing so, he surpassed the previous record of 42 years, 10 months set in 2017 by Yukio Tsuchiya.

On 23 September 2020, he started in the J1 League match against Kawasaki Frontale and in doing so became the oldest player to take to the pitch in a J1 League match and the oldest player ever in a football match in the highest national division worldwide. Miura played 57 minutes in this match.

Suzuka Point Getters 
On 30 December 2021, it was reported that Miura had reached an agreement to join the Suzuka Point Getters in the Japan Football League (JFL), the fourth tier of Japanese football. On 13 March 2022, Miura, at the age of 55, made his debut for the Point Getters in the first round of the Japan Football League with 4,620 spectators watching his debut, which is the highest attendance at a Suzuka home match, breaking their previous record of 1,308 spectators in 2019. His debut also meant that he broke the record of the oldest player to have ever featured in a JFL match at 55 years old, with a 12-year gap to the previous record holder. His presence at the club brought many curious spectators to see him in action, leading to the Point Getters having featured in nine of the ten matches with the highest attendance numbers throughout the 2022 season. This includes a 1–0 win against Criacao Shinjuku on 9 October 2022, which gathered a crowd of 16,218 spectators at the Japan National Stadium, becoming the highest-attended JFL match of all time. On 30 October 2022, Miura became the oldest player to score in the JFL, having converted from the penalty spot in the 85th minute of the match to seal Suzuka's 3–1 win against Tiamo Hirakata. He scored again from open play on 12 November 2022 at 55 years and 259 days old, breaking two more records. In total, from 30 October to 12 November, he played three matches and scored two goals.

Return to Europe 

On 26 January 2023, the Portuguese club U.D. Oliveirense announced that Miura will be playing for the Liga Portugal 2 club for the rest of the season. Back in November 2022, the owner of Yokohama F.C., Onodera Group, had become a majority shareholder (ownership of 52.5% of the stock) of U.D. Oliveirense.

The club from the city of Oliveira de Azeméis announced that Kazu astonishingly passed the medical tests with flying colors and launched an official presentation video of him featuring typical Japanese manga aesthetics and style.

At 56 years of age, Kazuyoshi Miura will by a large margin be the oldest person to ever play for any professional ball sports team in Portugal since Miguel Maia renewed his contract with Sporting Clube de Portugal volleyball team in 2018, after winning the top-level title at 47 years of age.

International career

Football 
In September 1990, Miura was named as part of the Japan squad for the 1990 Asian Games. At this competition, on September 26, he debuted against Bangladesh. After his debut, he played as a forward until 1997. In 1992, he played at the 1992 Asian Cup, which Japan went on to win. In 1993, in the 1994 World Cup qualification, he played thirteen games and scored thirteen goals. However, Japan failed to qualify for the 1994 World Cup. He also played at the 1994 Asian Games, the 1995 King Fahd Cup and the 1996 Asian Cup.

In 1997, Miura scored fourteen times for Japan during qualification for the 1998 World Cup, leading the Samurai Blue to their first ever World Cup finals. Despite this, Miura was controversially left out of the squad.

In February 2000, Miura played for Japan for the first time in two years. He played his last national team match later that year, and finished with the second-most career goals in Japanese national team history with 55 goals in 89 matches.

Futsal 
In 2012, and at the age of 45, Miura made his debut for the Japan futsal team in a 3–3 draw against Brazil. He came off the bench and was involved in the build up for the second goal scored by Nobuya Osodo. In his second appearance with the futsal team, he scored the third goal in a 3–1 win over Ukraine. In the 2012 Futsal World Cup, Miura appeared in all four matches for Japan, but failed to score as the Japanese were knocked out by Ukraine in the round of 16.

Personal life 
Since 1993, he has been married to former actress and model Risako Shitara. They have two children, Ryota Miura (born 1997) and Kota Miura.

Career statistics

Club 

.

International 

Scores and results list Japan's goal tally first, score column indicates score after each Miura goal.

Honours 
Matsubara
 Torneio Brasil Sul: 1986 

CRB
 Campeonato Alagoano: 1987 (in Portuguese)

Coritiba
 Campeonato Paranaense: 1989 (in Portuguese)

Tokyo Verdy
 Japan Soccer League: 1990–91, 1991–92,
 J1 League: 1993, 1994
 Emperor's Cup: 1996
 J.League Cup: 1992, 1993, 1994
 Japan Soccer League Cup: 1991
 Xerox Super Cup: 1994, 1995

Croatia Zagreb
 Prva HNL 1998–99

Yokohama
 J2 League: 2006; runners-up: 2019

Japan
 AFC Asian Cup: 1992
 Afro-Asian Cup of Nations: 1993

Individual
 Asian Footballer of the Year: 1992
 J.League MVP Award: 1993
 J.League Best XI: 1993, 1995, 1996
 J1 League 20th Anniversary Team: 2013
 J.League Top Scorer: 1996
 AFC Asian Cup Most Valuable Player: 1992

See also 

 List of men's footballers with 50 or more international goals
 List of men's footballers with the most official appearances

References

External links 

 
 
 
 
 Profile at Yokohama FC 
 
 Kazuyoshi Miura's Official Website
 

1967 births
Living people
Association football people from Shizuoka Prefecture
Japanese footballers
Japan international footballers
Japan Soccer League players
J1 League players
J2 League players
Japan Football League players
Serie A players
Croatian Football League players
Liga Portugal 2 players
Santos FC players
Sociedade Esportiva Palmeiras players
Clube de Regatas Brasil players
Esporte Clube XV de Novembro (Jaú) players
Coritiba Foot Ball Club players
Tokyo Verdy players
Genoa C.F.C. players
GNK Dinamo Zagreb players
Kyoto Sanga FC players
Vissel Kobe players
Yokohama FC players
Sydney FC players
Suzuka Point Getters players
J1 League Player of the Year winners
1992 AFC Asian Cup players
1995 King Fahd Cup players
1996 AFC Asian Cup players
AFC Asian Cup-winning players
Asian Footballer of the Year winners
Footballers at the 1990 Asian Games
Footballers at the 1994 Asian Games
Japanese expatriate footballers
Expatriate footballers in Brazil
Expatriate footballers in Italy
Expatriate footballers in Croatia
Expatriate soccer players in Australia
Expatriate footballers in Portugal
Japanese expatriate sportspeople in Brazil
Japanese expatriate sportspeople in Italy
Japanese expatriate sportspeople in Croatia
Japanese expatriate sportspeople in Australia
Japanese expatriate sportspeople in Portugal
Association football forwards
Japanese men's futsal players
Asian Games competitors for Japan